Maurice Arnim "Dutch" Baumgarten Sr. (March 10, 1908 – November 28, 1968) was an American football player and coach. He served as the head football coach at Stephen F. Austin University in Nacogdoches, Texas in 1941 and, later, as an assistant coach at Rice University in Houston from 1945 to 1947. During that time frame, he also served as an assistant baseball coach Rice.

Baumgarten was a three-time letter winner in football at the University of Texas at Austin from 1929 to 1931.

Head coaching record

References

External links
 

1908 births
1968 deaths
American football guards
Texas Longhorns football players
Rice Owls football coaches
Rice Owls baseball coaches
Stephen F. Austin Lumberjacks football coaches